Clark is a lunar impact crater that lies in the southern hemisphere of the Moon's far side. It is located midway between the larger walled plain Van der Waals to the south and the similar-sized crater Pizzetti to the north. It is named for American astronomer and telescope maker Alvan Clark and his son Alvan Graham Clark.

Clark has a narrow inner wall, and thus a wide interior floor. The rim is roughly circular, but eroded in places. A small crater lies across the southern rim, and a tiny pair are located along the northeastern crest. There is a slight outward bulge along the wall along the west-southwestern side. The crater floor is marked by a number of tiny craterlets but otherwise relatively featureless, having no central peak.

Satellite craters
By convention these features are identified on lunar maps by placing the letter on the side of the crater midpoint that is closest to Clark.

References

 
 
 
 
 
 
 
 
 
 
 
 

Impact craters on the Moon